In the Star Trek universe, a Class M planet is one habitable by humans and similar life forms. Earth, Vulcan, Romulus, and Qo'noS are examples of Class M planets. The planet needs an atmosphere of oxygen and nitrogen, should be close to a stable star, and have fertile soil and a climate that is generally pleasant for humans. Most planets shown in the franchise are Class M planets; occasionally another alphabetically named class of planet is shown, each hostile to humanoid life in one or more ways. As a story device, this allowed for easy filming without restriction by environmental suits, but Science correspondent Gretchen Vogel called it a "failure of imagination" when thinking about the limits of the zone capable of supporting life. The origin within the fictional universe is implied to be the Vulcan word Minshara.

See also
 Earth in science fiction

References

External links

Star Trek locations